The Laconia Order was issued by  Karl Dönitz during World War II as a result of the Laconia incident, forbidding the rescue of Allied survivors.

Prior to this incident, vessels of the  customarily picked up survivors of sunk Allied vessels. In September 1942, off the coast of West Africa in the Atlantic Ocean, the German vessels—among them ,  and —attempting to rescue survivors of the ocean liner  were indiscriminately attacked by American aircraft, despite having informed the Allies of the rescued Allied soldiers on board—along with many women and children—beforehand.

The order was as follows:
 All efforts to save survivors of sunken ships, such as the fishing out of swimming men and putting them on board lifeboats, the righting of overturned lifeboats, or the handing over of food and water, must stop.  Rescue contradicts the most basic demands of the war: the destruction of hostile ships and their crews.
 The orders concerning the bringing-in of captains and chief engineers stay in effect. 
 Survivors are to be saved only if their statements are important for the boat.
 Be harsh. Remember that the enemy has no regard for women and children when bombing German cities!

This order, along with War Order No. 154 of 1939, were introduced by the prosecution at the postwar Nuremberg trial of Grand Admiral Karl Dönitz at which Dönitz was indicted for war crimes, including the issuance of the Laconia Order:

Footnotes 

Battle of the Atlantic
Military history of Germany during World War II
RMS Laconia (1921)
World War II crimes